Events from the year 1894 in Ireland.

Events
 3 March –   William Ewart Gladstone resigns as Prime Minister of the United Kingdom. In his career, he introduced land reform to Ireland and also attempted to grant Home Rule.
 14 June – hooker Victory capsizes off Westport, County Mayo with the loss of at least 30 aboard.
 15 August – the Irish Land and Labour Association is formed at a labour convention at Limerick Junction, County Tipperary, with D. D. Sheehan as chairman and J. J. O'Shee as secretary.
 28–29 December – the SS Inishtrahull is lost off Kilkee with the loss of 26 aboard.
 The first meeting of the Irish Trades Union Congress takes place.
 The Irish Agricultural Organisation Society is established by Horace Plunkett. The new organisation encourages the co-operative movement.
 Professor John Joly of Trinity College Dublin, devises a colour photographic process.
 Bewley's open their first café in Dublin.

Arts and literature
 Thomas A. Finlay, S.J., is founding editor of the literary magazine The New Ireland Review (Dublin, March).
 George Moore publishes Esther Waters.
 Somerville and Ross publish The Real Charlotte.

Sport

Football
International
24 February  Wales 4–1 Ireland (in Swansea)
3 March  Ireland 2–2 England (in Belfast)
31 March Ireland 1–2 Scotland (in Belfast)

Irish League
Winners: Glentoran

Irish Cup
Winners: Distillery 2–2, 3–2 Linfield

Golf
Portmarnock Golf Club, Fingal, and Portstewart Golf Club, County Londonderry, are founded.

Births
1 January – Augustine Kelly, cricketer (died 1960).
30 January – Wentworth Allen, cricketer (died 1943).
22 April – Evie Hone, painter and stained glass artist (died 1955).
1 May – James Everett, Labour Party TD, Cabinet Minister, famed for Battle of Baltinglass, 44 years service as a TD (died 1967).
5 May – Joe Keppel, comic performer (died 1977).
15 June – Maurice Moore, Irish republican fighting in the Irish War of Independence (executed 1921).
28 June – Ronald Ossory Dunlop, painter and author (died 1973).
23 July – Norman Stronge, Ulster Unionist Party politician and Speaker of the Northern Ireland House of Commons for 23 years (died 1981).
9 August – Walter Starkie, author, translator and scholar of southern European civilisations (died 1976 in Spain)
24 August – Elisha Scott, footballer (died 1959).
31 August – Patrick Joseph Kelly, Bishop of Benin City (died 1991).
30 September – Michael Tierney, Cumann na nGaedheal TD, Fine Gael member of Seanad Éireann and President of University College Dublin (died 1975).
3 October – Frederick Jeremiah Edwards, recipient of the Victoria Cross for gallantry in 1916 at Thiepval, France (died 1964).
14 October – Tom McEllistrim, Fianna Fáil TD (died 1973).
14 November – Daniel Joseph Sheehan, Royal Naval Air Service and Royal Flying Corps pilot in World War I, killed in action (died 1917).
17 December – Cecile O'Rahilly, scholar of the Celtic languages and writer (died 1980).
Approximate date – Patricia Lynch, children's writer (died 1972).

Deaths
20 January – Robert Halpin, master mariner (born 1836).
30 August – Joseph Robinson Kirk, sculptor (born 1821).
26 September – Launt Thompson, sculptor (born 1833).
28 December – James Graham Fair, part-owner of the Comstock Lode, United States Senator and real estate and railroad speculator (born 1831).

References

 
1890s in Ireland
Ireland
Years of the 19th century in Ireland
Ireland